Thamnogalla is a fungal genus in the family Cordieritidaceae. It is a monotypic genus, containing the single lichenicolous species Thamnogalla crombii, found in Europe and North America. The genus was circumscribed in 1980 by David Leslie Hawksworth. The type species was originally described as Endocarpon crombiei by amateur botanist and collector William Mudd.

References

Leotiomycetes
Monotypic Ascomycota genera
Taxa described in 1980
Taxa named by David Leslie Hawksworth